The Army Aviation Corps (AAC) is an arm of the Indian Army which was formed on 1 November 1986. The corps is headed by a director general (with the rank of lieutenant general) at army headquarters in New Delhi.

History
The origin of Army Aviation Corps can be traced back to Army Aviation Wing of the Royal Indian Air Force in 1942 and subsequent formation of Indian Air Observation Post in August 1947. During Indo-Pakistani War of 1965 and Indo-Pakistani War of 1971, helicopters of Air Observation Post played vital role by flying close to enemy lines to help ground assets spot targets. In 1984, the Indian Army's Northern Command inducted the HAL Cheetah during the Siachen Glacier conflict and participated in Operation Meghdoot. Two years later, the Indian Air Force's Air Observation Post units were transferred to the Indian Army to form its Army Aviation Corps. With nine helicopter squadrons, the corps supported ground units by carrying men and material to the  Siachen Glacier until the 2003 ceasefire.

During the late-1980s Indian intervention in the Sri Lankan Civil War, the corps experienced jungle warfare during Operation Pawan. A unit of the Army Aviation Corps operated in Somalia as part of United Nations Operation in Somalia II from October 1993 to November 1994. During the operation, the corps flew over 2,000 hours accident-free with 100-percent serviceability in desert-like conditions. It also participated in the 1999 Kargil War during Operation Vijay carried out 2500 missions with 2700 hrs of operational flying evacuating 900 casualties from temporary and makeshift helipads. During 2015 Indian counter-insurgency operation in Myanmar, Army Aviation Corps transported 21 PARA (SF) for Operation Hot Pursuit.

Present day

Role
Army Aviation Corps pilots are drawn from other combat arms, including artillery officers. The Indian Air Force flies attack helicopters such as the Mil Mi-24/Mi-35 and HAL Rudra, which are under the operational control of the army. Helicopters such as the HAL Chetak, HAL Cheetah and HAL Dhruv provide logistical support for the Indian Army in remote and inaccessible areas.

The Army Aviation Corps also perform combat search and rescue (CSAR), artillery lift, combat transportation, logistics relief, military prisoner transportation and medical evacuation (MEDEVAC) in wartime and during natural disasters. The director general of the Army Aviation Corps is Lt Gen A.K. Suri.

Training
Army Aviation Corps candidates are trained at the Combat Army Aviation Training School (CATS) in Nashik; training was previously conducted at the School of Artillery in Deolali. A Cheetah helicopter simulator was installed at CATS to reduce training costs and pilot risk. The simulator exposes trainees to snow, rain, varied terrain, night flying, emergencies, and tactical maneuvers.

Organization

The Army Aviation Corps has several squadrons.  Among them are:
 201 Army Aviation Squadron "Night Raiders" (Dhruv Utility Helicopters)
 202 Army Aviation Squadron "Soaring Gideons" (Dhruv Utility Helicopters)
 203 Army Aviation Squadron "Ladakh Leviathans" (Dhruv Utility Helicopters)
 204 Army Aviation Squadron "Soldiers of the Sky" (Dhruv Utility Helicopters)
 206 Army Aviation Squadron "Hornbills" (Dhruv Utility Helicopters)
 207 Army Aviation Squadron "Magnificent 7" (Dhruv Utility Helicopters)
 251 Army Aviation Squadron (Rudra ALH-WSI Helicopters)
 252 Army Aviation Squadron (Rudra ALH-WSI Helicopters)
 257 Army Aviation Squadron "The Destroyers" (Rudra ALH-WSI Helicopters)
 301 Army Aviation Squadron - Special Operations (Dhruv Utility and Rudra ALH-WSI Helicopters)
 351 Army Aviation Squadron (Prachand Light Combat Helicopters)
 659 Army Aviation Squadron (Chetak and Cheetah Utility Helicopters)
 660 Army Aviation Squadron (Chetak and Cheetah Utility Helicopters)
 661 Army Aviation Squadron (Cheetah Utility Helicopters)
 662 Army Aviation Squadron
 663 Army Aviation Squadron "Snow Leopards" (Cheetah, Chetak and Dhruv Utility Helicopters)
 664 Army Aviation Squadron (Chetak and Cheetah Utility Helicopters)
 665 Army Aviation Squadron "Daring Hawks" (Cheetah, Chetak and Dhruv Utility Helicopters)
 666 Army Aviation Squadron "Siachen Saviours" (Cheetah and Dhruv Utility Helicopters)
 668 Army Aviation Squadron "Desert Chetaks" (Chetak Utility Helicopters)
 667 Army Aviation Squadron "Eastern Hawks" (Dhruv Utility Helicopters)
 669 Army Aviation Squadron "Desert Hawks" (Cheetah / Lancer and Rudra ALH-WSI Helicopters)
 670 Army Aviation Squadron "Blazing Falcons" (Cheetah and Dhruv Utility Helicopters)

On 1 June 2022, an attack squadron composed of Light Combat Helicopters was raised. A total of seven squadrons are planned with ten helicopters in each one
In addition, there are several Reconnaissance and Observation (R&O) flights that operate independently and are not attached to any squadrons.

Aircraft

Plans
In 2012, the army was evaluating helicopters from Kamov, Eurocopter and AgustaWestland for its light-helicopter contract for supplying troops stationed at high altitudes. The $750 million contract for the 197 helicopters intended to replace its 1970s Chetak and Cheetah helicopters for high-altitude surveillance and logistics. The successful bidder would provide 60 helicopters in operating condition; the remaining 137 aircraft would be produced by Hindustan Aeronautics Limited (HAL). The successful bidder was required to invest at least 30 percent of the contract in India. In December 2014, the Kamov Ka-226T was selected as a light utility helicopter to replace the Chetak and Cheetah while the HAL Light Utility Helicopter was developed. Kamov would build a production plant in India, and 197 helicopters would be purchased under the Make in India program. Of these 135 are earmarked for the Indian Army. However the deal was later dead by 2021. The Army was looking at the indigenous HAL Light Utility Helicopter and later placed order for it under limited series production.

Other planned acquisitions are:
 Boeing AH-64 Apache - In Feb 2020, The Indian Army Ordered 6 helicopters which is expected to be delivered in early 2023.
 Reconnaissance and surveillance helicopters – The HAL Light Utility Helicopter will replace the fleet of Cheetah and Chetak helicopters. The Indian Army requires 394 light helicopters, which the Defence Ministry decided to meet in two purchases. To meet immediate requirements, 197 light helicopters would be procured on the international market; Hindustan Aeronautics Limited would develop and manufacture 187 HAL Light Utility Helicopter, of which 126 would be for the Indian Army.
General Atomics MQ-9 Reaper - Indian Army is Planning to buy 10 armed predator drones.

See also
 Indian Naval Air Arm
 Indian Air Force

References

External links
 Army Aviation Corps(India)
 Army Aviation-A Force Multiplier

Administrative corps of the Indian Army
Military units and formations established in 1986
Army aviation units and formations
1986 establishments in India